Type U 127 submarine was a class of U-boats built during World War I by the Kaiserliche Marine.

The U-boats carried 16 torpedoes and had various arrangements of deck guns. Some had only one; others had two  SK L/45 guns.

List of Type U 127 submarines 
There were eight Type U 127 submarines built for the Kaiserliche Marine between 1913 and 1918. Only one was launched before the Armistice with Germany in 1918 and was subsequently surrendered to the Allies. The unfinished boats were broken up for scrap after the war.

 SM U-127（1913）
 SM U-128（1913）
 SM U-129（1913）
 SM U-130（1913）
 SM U-131（1914）
 （1914）
 SM U-133（1915）
 SM U-134（1916）

References

Citations

Bibliography

Submarine classes
 
World War I submarines of Germany